This is a list of Sierra Leonean writers.

 John Akar (1927–1975), broadcaster, playwright and diplomat
 Gaston Bart-Williams (1938–1990), exiled writer and journalist
 Ishmael Beah (born 1980), child soldier and memoirist
 Edward Wilmot Blyden (1832–1912), pan-Africanist, born in the Virgin Islands (see also Liberia)
 Adelaide Casely-Hayford (1868–1960), short story writer and educator 
 Gladys Casely-Hayford (1904–1950), poet also associated with Ghana 
 Syl Cheney-Coker (born 1945/47), poet, journalist and novelist 
 Robert Wellesley-Cole (1907–1995), surgeon and autobiographical writer
 William Conton (1925–2003), educator, historian, and novelist also associated with The Gambia 
 R. Sarif Easmon (1913–1997), doctor, playwright and novelist  
 Aminatta Forna (born 1964), memoirist and novelist
Namina Forna (born 1987), novelist and screen writer
 Wilfred Freddy Will Kanu Jr. (born 1977) author, poet, lyricist, hip-hop emcee and blogger. 
 Africanus Horton (1835–1883), Creole African nationalist writer
 Delia Jarrett-Macauley (living), academic and novelist
 Lemuel A. Johnson (1940/41–2002), poet and academic 
 Eldred Durosimi Jones (1925–2020), academic and literary critic
 Joseph Ben Kaifala (living), historian, memoirist and human rights activist
 Yulisa Amadu Maddy (1936–2014), playwright, novelist, and choreographer  
 Ambrose Massaquoi (born 1964), poet, musician and educationist 
 Augustus Merriman-Labor (1877–1919), later took the name Ohlohr Maigi, barrister, writer and munitions worker
 Abioseh Nicol (1924–1994), doctor and short story writer  
 Lenrie Peters (1932–2009), poet also associated with The Gambia
 Ekundayo Rowe (born 1937), journalist and short-story writer

See also
List of African writers by country
List of Sierra Leoneans

References

 
Sierra Leonean
Writers